Nattika is a small village in Thrissur district of Kerala state, South India. It is centrally located about 25 km from Thrissur, Kodungallur, Irinjalakuda, Chavakkad, Kunnamkulam and Guruvayur. Nattika is beside the Arabian Sea. There is a beach in this village called Nattika Beach. Nattika Beach was previously known as Attakuzhi Bandhar Kadapuram. Nattika is on the west coast of Thrissur. Conolly Canal is the eastern border of Nattika. There is a private bus stand in Thriprayar. Nattika is 60 km away from Cochin International Airport and 25 km away from Thrissur railway station. Modern transportation and better communication facilities are available in the village. This is an assembly constituency.

Places of worship
The Sree Rama temple of Triprayar is in Nattika Panchayat. This temple has the biggest Sree Rama shrine in south India. This Temple has brought glory and fame to the place. This is considered to be a holy place for Hindus. Nattika Sree Arikiri Bhagavathy temple is the famous Bhadra Kali temple in Nattika. There are many temples in Nattika including the Eyyani Annapoorneswari Temple, Sree Durga Devi Kshethram, Nattika (Vaily), Netrakovil Siva Temple, Vazhakulam Temple, Arayamparambil Temple,Panaparambil Temple, Panakkal Pandikasalakkal Durga Bhagavati Temple, Nagadevata Temple, Eran Samajam Temple, Erachan Sree Bhadrakali temple, Thottupura Temple, etc. There exists a famous mosque at Nattika Beach which was believed to be built at least three hundred years ago and was renovated around 1985. Nattika beach Yaseen masjid is another mosque in this area.

Educational Institutions
 Sree Narayana College, Nattika affiliated to the University Of Calicut.
 Sree Narayana Guru College Of Advanced Studies (SNGC), Nattika affiliated to the University Of Calicut.
 Sree Rama Polytechnic, Thriprayar 
 S N Trust Senior Secondary School, Nattika
 Lemer Public School, Thriprayar
 G TEC Computer Education College, Nattika
 Government Fisheries School, Nattika. (B.Ed. Teachers Training Institute affiliated to the University of Calicut)
 Government Mapila LP School, Nattika
 KMUP School, Nattika
 Central UP School, Nattika
 Shoukathul Islam Madrasa.
There exists a TSGA Indoor Stadium at Thriprayar which hosts many state and national level events.

Society
People from all religions & castes co-exists in harmony at Nattika including Hindus, Muslims and Christians. There are a lot of people belonging to the Dheevara Community.

Fishing was an important economic activity and source of income in the past. The major source income of the people is the remittance from Middle east. 
At Nattika Beach, every year a big fest, Oruma, is held by the Kerala Government for promoting tourism. This programme runs for a week and thousands of people come to see and participate in this festival. Many elephants are decorated and brought for this festival and there are different types of cultural programmes performed by famous artists from different fields.

Nattika beach is a 3 km long White sandy beach and fishing is carried on here and now, there are many Ayurveda resorts and many tourists from different parts of world visit these resorts. East Tipu Sultan road and west Tipu Sulthan road pass through the village. Another claim to fame is that the evergreen classic Malayalam Movie "Chemmeen" was shot here.

Politics
Nattika assembly constituency is part of Trichur (Lok Sabha constituency).

See also 
 Sree Narayana College (SN College), Nattika 
 Sree Narayana Guru College Of Advanced Studies (SNGC), Nattika 
 University Of Calicut.

References

Villages in Thrissur district